"For the Damaged Coda" is a song written and performed by American indie rock band Blonde Redhead. It was released on June 6, 2000 via Touch and Go Records as the eleventh and final track on their fifth studio album Melody of Certain Damaged Lemons.

The song, a continuation of "For the Damaged," is based on Frédéric Chopin's Nocturne in F minor, Op. 55, No. 1, and gained renewed exposure after appearing in an episode of the animated television series Rick and Morty as the theme for the character Evil Morty, and has since become an internet meme. It was also included in The Rick And Morty Soundtrack. The song was sampled in B.o.B.'s 2017 song "BoBiverse".

Charts

Music video 
The music video was first uploaded to YouTube on February 5, 2008, and has over 47 million views as of October, 2022. Official upload from October 24, 2017 has nearly 2 million views.

Personnel
Kazu Makino – main artist
Amedeo Pace – main artist
Simone Pace – main artist
Tobias Nathaniel – piano
Ryan Hadlock – engineering, producer
Guy Picciotto – producer
Brad Zeffren – engineering
Howie Weinberg – mastering

References

2000 songs
American indie rock songs